Basarabia Reînnoită was a newspaper from Iaşi, Romania, founded in March 1907 by Leonida Stamati, a boyar from Soroca involved in politics. After four issues, the newspaper was closed at the request of the Russian authorities.

References

Bibliography 
 Almanahul dicţionar al presei din România şi a celei româneşti de pretutindeni de G. Caliga. – București, 1926. – p. 155.

External links 
 PRESA BASARABEANĂ de la începuturi pînă în anul 1957. Catalog
 Câteva tentative de construire în Basarabia ale unor partide politice de orientare naţională

1907 establishments in Romania
1907 disestablishments in Romania
Bessarabia Governorate
Defunct newspapers published in Romania
Mass media in Iași
Newspapers established in 1907
Publications disestablished in 1907
Romanian-language newspapers published in Moldova